Mouchak (Bengali: মৌচাক) is a Bengali romantic comedy film directed by Arabinda Mukhopadhyay and produced under the banner of Pratima Pictures. The film stars Uttam Kumar, Sabitri Chatterjee, Ranjit Mullick, Mithu Mukherjee, Sulata Choudhury, Ratna Ghoshal, and Nripati Chattopadhyay in lead roles. Nachiketa Ghosh scored the music in the film. The film was released on 10 January 1974. The film is one of the best and most popular comedy film ever. The film become blockbuster hit at the box office.

Plot
Eligible bachelor Sitesh Roy lives with his elder brother Nitish and sister-in-law. He gets a job in a jute mill, which is seventy miles away from his house and so he decides to live in a rented house, there. But after few days, he becomes frantic with the marriage proposals from local residents. Everyone including his office boss coaxes him to marry his aged daughter and numerous funny incidents start rolling. However, Sitesh falls for Neepa, a headstrong, smart girl who lives opposite to Sitesh's apartment, who also falls in love with him. In the meantime, to save his brother from the hands of crazy fathers, Nitish visits Sitesh and campaigns for his brother as an alcohol addict and a man with several vices. As a result, Neepa's father does not approve of the love affair and the couple start making plans to prove that Sitesh is actually innocent. Later, Nitish and his wife come to Sitesh's flat and rescue him from all odds. After a huge drama and laugh riot, Sitesh and Neepa confess their relationship and everything is solved with a happy ending.

Cast
 Uttam Kumar as Nitish Roy
 Sabitri Chatterjee as Nitish's Wife
 Ranjit Mallick as Sitesh Roy
 Ajoy Bandyopadhyay
 Mithu Mukherjee as Neepa
 Shekhar Chattopadhyay as Mr. Chowdhury
 Gita Dey as Chowdhury's wife
 Robi Ghosh as Panchu
 Ratna Ghoshal as Champa
 Nripati Chattopadhyay
 Anup Kumar as Talukder
 Chinmoy Ray as Radhika
 Gurudas Bandyopadhyay as Neepa's Father
 Tapati Ghosh as Neepa's Mother
 Sulata Chowdhury as Leena, Chowdhury's Daughter
 Tarun Kumar as D R Ghoshal
 Moni Shrimani
 Durgadas Bandyopadhyay (Jr.) as Sukhamay Banerjee
 Kamu Mukherjee as kallu
 Haridhan Mukhopadhyay
 Amarnath Mukhopadhyay as Dr Gupta
 Samar Kumar

Soundtrack 
 
Every songs become huge popular.

Reception
The film is regarded as one of the best and most popular comedy film in Bengali cinema. The film become blockbuster hit at the box office and ran for 119 days in theaters.

The film is also the most remembered film ever and attracts todays audiences through the OTT Platforms to TV Channels, the viewership being always well in every where.

References

External links
 

1974 films
Indian black-and-white films
Bengali-language Indian films
1974 romantic comedy films
Indian romantic comedy films
1970s Bengali-language films
Films based on works by Samaresh Basu